Grindelia hirsutula is a North American species of flowering plant in the family Asteraceae known by the common names hairy gumplant and hairy gumweed.

Distribution
Grindelia hirsutula is native to North America, widespread across Canada and in California and Oregon.  The species is highly variable, and many local populations have been named as varieties or as distinct species. All these taxa do, however, intergrade with one another.

Description
The plant is usually green but the stems are often red or purplish-brown and the leaves can be somewhat yellowish to reddish.

The plant can produce numerous flower heads in branching arrays at the top of the plant. The center of the head is filled with many small yellow disc florets surround by numerous golden ray florets. The head produces a thick white exudate, especially in new flower heads.

Varieties
Grindelia hirsutula var. maritima — San Francisco Gum Plant,  San Francisco gumplant, coastal gumweed; endemic to coastal California in the San Francisco Bay Area.

References

External links
USDA Plants Profile for Grindelia hirsutula (hairy gumweed)
CalFlora Database: Grindelia hirsutula (gumweed,  hairy gumweed)
Jepson Manual Treatment of Grindelia hirsutula
University of California, Calphoto Photos gallery— Grindelia hirsutula

hirsutula
Flora of California
Flora of Canada
Flora of Oregon
Flora of the Sierra Nevada (United States)
Natural history of the California chaparral and woodlands
Natural history of the California Coast Ranges
Natural history of the Central Valley (California)
Natural history of the San Francisco Bay Area
Plants described in 1833
Flora without expected TNC conservation status